Toshiko Plays Billy Strayhorn (also released as A Tribute to Billy Strayhorn (JAM) and Dedications III (Alfa)) is a jazz album recorded by two different configurations of the Toshiko Akiyoshi Trio in 1978.  It was released on the Discomate record label (and later by Alfa Records) in Japan and on the JAM Record label in the USA.

Track listing
All songs composed by Billy Strayhorn except "Day Dream," composed by Strayhorn and Duke Ellington:
LP side A
"Take the "A" Train" – 4:53
"Day Dream" – 2:59
"Rain Check" – 5:28
"Lotus Blossom" – 3:54
LP side B
"Charpoy" – 5:22
"Lush Life" – 3:52
"Chelsea Bridge (song)" – 4:32
"Intimacy of the Blues" – 6:26

Personnel
Toshiko Akiyoshi – piano
All tracks except A3, B4:
Peter Donald – drums
John Heard – bass
Tracks A3, B4:
Jeff Hamilton – drums
Bob Daugherty – bass

References / External links
Discomate DSP-5011
JAM Records (USA) JAM 5003
Alfa Records (Japan) ALCR-163
[ Allmusic]

Toshiko Akiyoshi albums
1978 albums